Fast Company is a 1924 short silent comedy film directed by Robert F. McGowan. It was the 32nd Our Gang short subject released.

Plot
Mickey trades places with a little rich boy, who is staying at a ritzy hotel. Mayhem ensues when the gang invades the hotel to look for Mickey and discover the snooty society ladies, a mischievous monkey, and a fireworks salesman. Later, the gang dress up as cannibals and organize a mock-tribal ritual.

Production notes
Regular Our Gang director Robert F. McGowan was injured in a fall after a camera platform collapsed, rendering him unable to work for several months. Director Charles Parrott stepped in for the ailing McGowan but was called away to New York City to address corporate matters and the unfinished film was shelved indefinitely. McGowan eventually resurrected production and completed the film nearly a year later. This resulted in appearances from Our Gang members Ernie Morrison and Jack Davis who had already left the series but returned to complete Fast Company.

When the silent Pathé Our Gang comedies were syndicated for television as "The Mischief Makers" in 1960, Fast Company was retitled The Big Switch.

Cast

The Gang
 Joe Cobb — Joe
 Jackie Condon — Jackie McChicken
 Mickey Daniels — Mickey
 Allen Hoskins — Farina
 Jack Davis — Jack McChicken
 Mary Kornman — Mary
 Ernie Morrison — Ernie
 Dinah the Mule

Additional cast
 Lassie Lou Ahern — Mary's sister
 Hal Roach Jr. — boy teasing Farina
 Walter Wilkinson — Rondamere Von Swell
 Charles A. Bachman — police officer
 Helen Gilmore — Traveler's Aid Society woman
 Charlie Hall — bellboy
 Del Henderson — hotel guest
 Lyle Tayo — hotel guest
 Charley Young — man falling out of window

References

External links
 
 

1924 films
American silent short films
American black-and-white films
Films directed by Robert F. McGowan
Hal Roach Studios short films
1924 comedy films
Our Gang films
1924 short films
1920s American films
Silent American comedy films
1920s English-language films